Holy Family Cathedral, Cathedral of the Holy Family, or other variations on the name, may refer to:

Antigua and Barbuda
Holy Family Cathedral (St. John's)

Canada
Holy Family Cathedral (Saskatoon)

Indonesia
Holy Family Cathedral, Banjarmasin

Kenya
Cathedral Basilica of the Holy Family, Nairobi

Kuwait
Holy Family Cathedral, Kuwait City

Poland
Cathedral Basilica of the Holy Family, Częstochowa

South Sudan
Holy Family Cathedral, Rumbek

United Kingdom
Ukrainian Catholic Cathedral of the Holy Family in Exile, London

United States
 Holy Family Old Cathedral (Anchorage, Alaska)
 Cathedral of the Holy Family (Tafuna, American Samoa)
 Holy Family Cathedral (Orange, California)
 Holy Family Cathedral (Tulsa, Oklahoma)

See also
Holy Family (disambiguation)
Holy Family Church (disambiguation)